Glentworth is a community in Saskatchewan. It is surrounded by the Rural Municipality of Waverley No. 44, whose office is located within the hamlet.

Etymology

Glentworth is named after the village of Glentworth, Lincolnshire, England.

References 

Former villages in Saskatchewan
Unincorporated communities in Saskatchewan
Waverley No. 44, Saskatchewan
Division No. 3, Saskatchewan